"Bailé Con Mi Ex" is a song recorded by American singer Becky G. It was released by Kemosabe Records, RCA Records and Sony Music Latin on May 10, 2022, as the fifth and final single from Gomez's second Spanish studio album, Esquemas (2022). It was written by Gomez, Blake Slatkin, Keegan Bach, Manuel Lorente Freire, Gregory Hein, Andrew Jackson, Mario Caceres, Hector Andre Mazzarri Ramos.

Music video
The music video was released on May 13, 2022. It was directed by Pedro Artola. The video features Gomez in an almost-empty house with her boyfriend, interspersed with scenes of them dancing at a club. It has over 20 million views on YouTube as of March 2023.

Live performances
On May 15, 2022, Gomez performed "Bailé Con Mi Ex" on the 2022 Billboard Music Awards, along with "Mamiii". On May 24, 2022, Gomez performed on the Jimmy Kimmel Live!.

Critical reception

Accolades

Charts

Weekly charts

Year-end charts

Certifications

References

2022 singles
2022 songs
Becky G songs
Songs written by Becky G
Songs written by KBeaZy
Spanish-language songs